Badla is a village in Kalna II CD block in Kalna subdivision of Purba Bardhaman district in the Indian state of West Bengal.

Geography

Location
Badla is located near Singarkone, where the CD block offices of Kalna II CD block are there.

Urbanisation
87.00% of the population of Kalna subdivision live in the rural areas. Only 13.00% of the population live in the urban areas. The map alongside presents some of the notable locations in the subdivision. All places marked in the map are linked in the larger full screen map.

Demographics
As per the 2011 Census of India, Badla had a total population of 1,935 of which 950 (49%) were males and 985 (51%) were females. Population below 6 years was 187. The total number of literates in  Badla was 1,307 (74.77% of the population over 6 years).

Transport
Pandua-Singarkone Road links Badla to Boinchi-Kalna Road.

Education
Badla Vivekananda B.Ed. College was established in 2015.

Culture
Baidyapur Jora Deul, a monument of national importance, is located nearby.

Healthcare
Badla block primary health centre at Badla, PO Chagram (with 15 beds) is the main medical facility in Kalna II CD block. There are primary health centres at Akalpoush (with 6 beds), Angarson, PO Pindra (with 2 beds), Baidyapur (with 15 beds) and Tehatta (with 2 beds). In 2012, the average monthly patients attending Badla BPHC were 4,684 and average monthly admissions were 115. It handled 1,222 annual emergency admissions.

See also - Healthcare in West Bengal

References

Villages in Purba Bardhaman district